MS Spirit of Britain is a cross-channel ferry operated by P&O Ferries on the Dover-Calais route. She is the first of two 'Spirit' class ships built for P&O Ferries, the other being . The vessels are the largest ferries constructed for the cross-channel route.

History
P&O Ferries signed a €360m contract with Aker Yards (later renamed STX Europe) on 8 August 2008, for the two largest ferries ever to be constructed for the Dover-Calais service.

The new vessels were specifically designed for the Dover-Calais route and are built to Lloyd’s Register ‘Green Passport’ which provides a comprehensive strategy for all materials used. The ferries are environmentally friendly, offering significant advances in fuel efficiency through a hydro-dynamically efficient hull form that optimises vessel performance with minimum fuel consumption. They are the first passenger ferries in the world to comply with the new International Maritime Organization "Safe Return to Port" requirements, ahead of the international compliance date. These rules require that, in the event of a ship becoming a casualty, basic services are provided to all persons on board and that certain systems remain operational for safe return to port. Performance standards are stipulated for a wide range of ship systems including fire-fighting, power supply, propulsion, steering and navigation. The requirements come into force for vessels built after 1 July 2010.

The ships have the Lloyd's Register class notation of PSMR (propulsion and steering machinery redundancy) which will be assigned where the main propulsion and steering systems are configured to ensure that, in the event of equipment failure, the ship retains availability of propulsion power and manoeuvring capability to provide a safe return to port.

In early 2019, Spirit of Britain was reflagged from the Port of Dover England to Limassol, Cyprus in the lead up to Brexit.

3 March 2009: The first steel plate was cut by P&O Ferries chief executive, Helen Deeble.
25 August 2009: The keel block was laid at the STX Europe Rauma shipyard in Rauma, Finland. In keeping with maritime tradition, coins were placed under the keel for good fortune.
13 May 2010: It was announced that the new ships would be named Spirit of Britain and Spirit of France. Spirit of Britain was originally to be called Olympic Spirit, but was renamed to avoid copyright infringement. Dame Kelly Holmes agreed to become godmother to the Spirit of Britain.
8 June 2010: Spirit of Britain is floated out of its construction dock in Rauma, Finland.
8 June 2010: After being floated out of her building dock Spirit of Britain is manoeuvred to the fitting out quay by tugs.
21 March 2022: Transport Secretary Grant Shapps MP announced that he would seek P&O Ferries to rename Spirit of Britain and other ships on the fleet which carry British names if the company were found to have breached employment regulations following the summary dismissal without notice via Zoom of 800 British seafarers to be replaced with cheaper overseas agency workers. P&O Ferries CEO Peter Hebblethwaite confirmed on 24 March that P&O was aware that its firing the seafarers without consultation was illegal.

Sea trials and delivery
23 November 2010: Departs the STX Europe shipyard in Rauma at 10:00 for her first sea trials in the Gulf of Bothnia.
December 2010: Registered owner and ship manager; P&O Short Sea Ferries Ltd, Dover, United Kingdom.
5 January 2011: Delivered to P&O Ferries at Rauma, in Finland.
5 January 2011: Departed STX Europe's Rauma shipyard on her delivery voyage to Dover. Owing to heavy ice conditions in the Baltic she was escorted by the ice breaker Nordica until she reached Stockholm, Sweden.
9 January 2011: Arrived at the Port of Dover shortly after 11:00 escorted by the Dover Harbour Board Tugs DHB Dauntless and DHB Doughty.
9 January 2011: After crossing the bay and turning she proceeded to berth one on the Eastern Arm.
10 January 2011: Moved to berth six in the eastern docks to continue her preparations to take up service on 21 January 2011.
11 January 2011: Marin Ark deployment carried out alongside in Dover's berth six.
14 January 2011: Carried out berthing trials within the Port of Dover.
15 January 2011: Carried out berthing trials in the Port of Calais.
21 January 2011: Entered commercial service between Dover and Calais under the command of senior master, Captain David Miller.
24 January 2011: Proceeded to ARNO in Dunkerque for 48 hours of remedial work to ensure a better port fit in the port of Calais. Her bow spade was extended by 300mm on deck five and by 150mm on deck three.
4 February 2011: Aborted her 09:20 sailing with technical problems. It was reported that she was suffering shaft problems. She departed Dover at 12:30 with the assistance of two tugs and proceeded to the Margate Roads.
5 February 2011: Departed the Margate Roads bound for Zeebrugge, arriving at 23:30.
6 February 2011: Departed Zeebrugge at 16:30. She duly arrived in Dover at 22:00 before taking up the 23:15 sailing to Calais.
24 March 2011: Officially named Spirit of Britain by Dame Kelly Holmes MBE at Dover's eastern docks. She sailed from the port at 13:30 for a special cruise before returning to Dover at 14:30. She resumed service between Dover and Calais at 17:30.
10 May 2011: Reported to be out of service due to an electrical problem.
11 May 2011: Re-entered service between Dover and Calais.
28 December 2011: Departed Dover for a hull inspection in Falmouth, Cornwall.
5 January 2012: Arrived back in Dover and took up the 19:05 service to Calais.

Spirit of Britain arrived in Dover on Sunday, 9 January 2011 shortly after 11:00, after successful sea trials. After berthing trials at Dover on 14 January 2011, and in Calais the following day, Spirit of Britain began service on 21 January 2011, under the command of senior master, Captain David Miller. Since then, Spirit of Britain has been to Dunkerque, Margate Roads, Zeebrugge and Falmouth for maintenance, and also returned to her builders in March and April 2012, to resolve a vibration problem, at STX Europe's expense.

On 23 January 2016 western anarchists encouraged some 350 illegal immigrants from the Calais Jungle to storm the port of Calais. Around 50 people got on board the MS Spirit of Britain and were later arrested by police.

Sister ships

References

Notes

Bibliography

Ferries of England
Ferries of France
Connections across the English Channel
2010 ships
Ships of P&O Ferries